Zhytniy Market is one of the oldest operating markets in Kyiv. It dates to the time of the Kievan Rus', and has been a major marketplace since the 15th century.

References 

Retail markets in Ukraine